Dalagang Bukid (English: Country Maiden) is a 1919 Filipino silent film. Directed by José Nepomuceno, it is recognized as the first full-length Filipino produced and directed feature film. An adaptation of the Tagalog sarsuwela of the same name by Hermogenes Ilagan, the film stars Atang de la Rama and Marceliano Ilagan, both of whom reprise their roles from the original sarsuwela production.

All of Nepomuceno's films, including Dalagang Bukid and its sequel La Venganza de Don Silvestre, are lost.

Plot 
Angelita (Atang de la Rama), a young flower vendor who works in front of a cabaret named Dalagang Bukid, and poor law student Cipriano (Marceliano Ilagan) are in love. However, Angelita is forced by her parents to marry a wealthy loan shark, Don Silvestre, as they need money to pay for their gambling habit and other vices. Angelita's parents grant Don Silvestre permission to marry their daughter after he arranges for her to win a beauty contest. Before the coronation, Angelita and Cipriano wed in secret at Santa Cruz Church. They travel together to the coronation pageant only to inform Don Silvestre that they are now married. The film ends with the elderly loan shark fainting upon hearing the news.

Cast 
Atang de la Rama as Angelita
Marceliano Ilagan as Cipriano

Production 
Prior to Dalagang Bukid, several foreigners had directed and produced films in the Philippines, including Edward Meyer Gross's Vida y Muerte del Dr. José Rizal (1912) and Albert Yearsley's Walang Sugat (1912). Inspired by the foreign filmmakers, photo studio owner José Nepomuceno became interested in moving pictures and purchased equipment from Gross's Rizalina Film Manufacturing Company. On May 15, 1917, Nepomuceno set up the film production company Malayan Movies.

After producing short news reels and documentaries, Nepomuceno decided to direct and produce an adaptation of Hermogenes Ilagan and Leon Ignacio's popular sarsuwela Dalagang Bukid. The sarsuwela was first staged in 1917 by Compañia de Zarzuela Ilagan at the Teatro Zorilla. It stared Atang de la Rama, who reprised her role in Nepomuceno's film adaptation.

Release 
The film premiered on September 12, 1919 at Teatro de la Comedia before moving to the Empire Theatre. Although it is a silent film, during its theatrical run, its lead actress Atang de la Rama would standby in the theater's wings to sing the theme song "Nabasag ang Banga" (The Clay Pot Broke) as the film played.

The film was a box office success, making a ₱90,000 return after a week of screening.

Reception 
The film received mixed reviews upon release. The Manila Nueva found that it is "a realistic portrait of many Filipino families, although its pessimistic tone is a bit exaggerated." Meanwhile, The Citizen criticized the film for being "all that the play is not" and "an incoherent jumble of scenes that border on the childish and the ridiculous and the exotic."

Themes 
Despite its earlier negative review, a contemporary article published in The Citizen associated Dalagang Bukid with the rise of a national consciousness in cinema. It suggested that the film would be "the forerunner of many more films that have for their motif the depicting of the Philippine life and social conditions peculiar to the type of our culture and civilization." The article added that "the motion picture appears to have some bearing on the subject" of Philippine independence from American occupation. 

Film historian Nadi Tofighian suggests that the choice of a Tagalog sarsuwela as source material for his first film meant José Nepomuceno wanted to show typical Filipino life against growing "Americanisation." He draws attention to the "central role and symbolic value" of Filipino national hero José Rizal, whose portrait hangs in the home of the film's heroine Angelita. 

Nepomuceno himself declared that his film company's purpose was to make films "to the conditions and tastes of the country," which Filipino film historian Nick Deocampo considers a pitch towards nationalism against the influence of America. Deocampo highlights, however, that the declaration fails to consider the Spanish colonial influence on the source material and subsequent film.

Sequel 
In the original sarsuwela production, Don Silvestre begrudgingly gives the young couple his blessing. In the film adaptation, he merely faints upon hearing the news of their marriage. This gave way for the production of a sequel, La Venganza de Don Silvestre, which premiered a month later on October 12, 1919.

Legacy 

The film was officially recognized as the first Filipino produced and directed film by the Philippine government in the 2018 Proclamation No. 622. The Proclamation declared September 12, 2019 to September 11, 2020 the centennial year of Philippine cinema. The dates were chosen as Dalagang Bukid would celebrate its centennial that year.

References

Works cited

Further reading

External links 

1919 films
Philippine silent films
Tagalog-language films
1919 romantic drama films
Philippine romantic drama films
Lost Philippine films
Philippine black-and-white films
Cockfighting in film
Silent romantic drama films